Riverside Township, Illinois may refer to:
 Riverside Township, Adams County, Illinois
 Riverside Township, Cook County, Illinois

See also
Riverside Township (disambiguation)

Illinois township disambiguation pages